Vitali Nidbaykin (born 22 May 1961) is a retired Russian professional footballer.

Nidbaykin played in the Russian Top League with FC Kuban Krasnodar.

External links
Profile at Footballfacts.ru

1961 births
Living people
Soviet footballers
Russian footballers
Russian Premier League players
Russian expatriate footballers
Expatriate footballers in Finland
FC Fakel Voronezh players
FC Kuban Krasnodar players
FC Torpedo Miass players
Pallo-Kerho 37 players
Association football forwards
FC Dynamo Bryansk players
FC Znamya Truda Orekhovo-Zuyevo players
Sportspeople from Bryansk